Waltair was an airline operating in the Democratic Republic of the Congo in years 1983-2005. It was famous of being one of the last companies in the world using Sud Caravelle aircraft. Their AOC was revoked by the Congolese Civil Aviation Authority in 2005 and the company was also added into the list of banned airlines in the European Union.

Fleet
Waltair used to operate the following aircraft types

Douglas DC-8
Sud Caravelle
Hawker Siddeley Andover

See also		
 Transport in the Democratic Republic of the Congo

References

Airlines established in 1983
Airlines disestablished in 2005
Defunct airlines of the Democratic Republic of the Congo
Companies based in Kinshasa